Maple Springs is an unincorporated community in Pepin Township, Wabasha County, Minnesota, United States, along the Mississippi River and Lake Pepin.  The Mississippi River and King Creek meet at Maple Springs.

The community is located between Lake City and Wabasha along U.S. Highway 61 at the intersection with 247th Avenue.

Nearby places include Lake City, Wabasha, Camp Lacupolis, and Reads Landing.

Maple Springs was originally named King's Cooley, after a coulee on the farm of a nearby settler named King.  It had a station on the former Chicago, Milwaukee and St. Paul Railroad – the "Milwaukee Road".

Local businesses include a fishing resort along Lake Pepin.

References

Unincorporated communities in Minnesota
Unincorporated communities in Wabasha County, Minnesota
Rochester metropolitan area, Minnesota
Minnesota populated places on the Mississippi River